Gerrie Eijlers (born 9 May 1980) is a Dutch retired handball player.

He represented the Netherlands at the 2020 European Men's Handball Championship.

References

External links

1980 births
Living people
Dutch male handball players
Sportspeople from Amsterdam
Expatriate handball players
Dutch expatriate sportspeople in Germany
Handball-Bundesliga players